List of feature films produced by Vitagraph Studios between 1914 and 1925, when it was absorbed into Warner Bros. The company also produced numerous short films during the era.

1910s

1920s

References

Bibliography
 Dewey, Donald. Buccaneer: James Stuart Blackton and the Birth of American Movies. Rowman & Littlefield, 2016.
 Munden, Kenneth White. The American Film Institute Catalog of Motion Pictures Produced in the United States, Part 1. University of California Press, 1997.
 Slide, Anthony. The New Historical Dictionary of the American Film Industry. Routledge, 2014.
Encyclopedia of Early Cinema, ed. Richard Abel (London: Routledge, 2005), 679; and Adam Lauder, “It’s Alive!: Bertram Brooker and Vitalism,” in The Logic of Nature, the Romance of Space: Elements of Canadian Modernist Painting, ed. Cassandra Getty (Windsor, ON; Oshawa, ON: Art Gallery of Windsor; The Robert McLaughlin Gallery, 2010), 104n93.

Vitagraph Studios films
Vitagraph Studios
Vitagraph Studios